The Hyundai Aslan is an executive car manufactured and marketed by Hyundai from 2014–2018. Its exterior and interior design are similar to those of the rear-wheel-drive Genesis but it shares the front-wheel-drive Y6 platform with the Grandeur. In terms of size, it is situated between the Grandeur and Genesis replacing the market segment previously held by the Dynasty. The name "aslan" is Turkish for lion.

Engines

Transmissions
All models from 2014–2016 include a 6-speed automatic transmission with SHIFTRONIC manual shift mode. 2017 models include an 8-speed automatic transmission with SHIFTRONIC manual shift mode.

Equipment
Rear Cross-Traffic Alert
Blind Spot Detection
LDWS Lane Departure Warning with Lane Keep Assist
FCWS Forward collision warning system 
ASCC Advanced Smart Cruise Control Stop & Go
Automotive head-up display
Human–machine interface
AFLS Advanced Front-Lighting System HID Headlights with High Beam Assist
Tire Pressure Monitoring with Individual Tire Indicator
Intelligent Drive Mode monitors and modifies engine throttle response, transmission shift points, steering and suspension.
Continuous Damping Control
ASPAS Advanced Smart Parking Assist System
AVM Around View Monitor

References

External links

 Hyundai Aslan Official Website: South Korea 

Cars introduced in 2014
Aslan
Executive cars
Sedans
Front-wheel-drive vehicles
Flagship vehicles